Anime-influenced animation refers to non-Japanese works of animation that are similar to or inspired by anime. Generally, the term anime refers to a style of animation originating from Japan. As Japanese anime became increasingly popular, Western animation studios began implementing some visual stylizations typical in anime—such as exaggerated facial expressions and "super deformed" versions of characters.

Although outside Japan, anime is specifically used to mean animation from Japan or as a Japanese-disseminated animation style often characterized by colorful graphics, vibrant characters and fantastical themes, there is a debate over whether the culturally abstract approach to the word's meaning may open up the possibility of anime produced in countries other than Japan. Anime-influenced animation produced in China are called “Donghua”.

Americas

United States

Television

One of the first noted attempts from American companies on making a series visually inspired by anime was The King Kong Show in the late 1960s and early 1970s. It was the result of a collaboration between Toei Animation from Japan and Videocraft from America. The result was an animation with an Anime-like visual style and a Japanese Kaiju theme, that incorporated the cartoonish style of the Hanna-Barbera era in American TV animation. Likewise, Hanna-Barbera's earlier series Frankenstein Jr. was heavily inspired by the Gigantor anime series, although its art style was more similar to that of other American cartoons of the time. Another early example of this might be Johnny Cypher in Dimension Zero.

Toei Animation continued this type of collaboration in the Transformers TV series, which aired in the 1980s. While this animation was animated by Toei Animation, the series was produced by and for Americans. Transformers showed many influences and elements of anime including story, themes, and a style that resembled Mecha anime. 
Another example of this is Voltron; an American mecha series that reuses the animation from previously released Toei Japanese anime, creating a new story written by American writers.

This trend continued throughout the 1980s with series like Dungeons and Dragons, again co-produced by Toei Animation. Throughout the 1980s and the 1990s, many American shows started to be outsourced to Japanese animators, most notably TMS Entertainment, which animated popular television productions such as X-Men, Teenage Mutant Ninja Turtles, ThunderCats, Inspector Gadget, The Real Ghostbusters, Rainbow Brite, Tiny Toon Adventures, DuckTales, Chip 'n Dale: Rescue Rangers, TaleSpin, Darkwing Duck, Animaniacs and Spider-Man, most of which visually or thematically were not reminiscent of Japanese anime. TaleSpin did, however, take inspiration from Hayao Miyazaki's 1989 manga Hikōtei Jidai.

Throughout the 1990s, some American cartoons began showing a strong influence from anime without having any Japanese artists directly involved in the project. Examples of this can be seen in Cartoon Network shows like The Powerpuff Girls and Dexter's Laboratory or the Disney Channel show Kim Possible.

Other notable examples of series with an anime influence are Batman: The Animated Series which was actually partially outsourced to Japanese artists, Gargoyles, and Teen Titans, The Boondocks, Megas XLR, and The Batman. Batman Beyond displayed some characteristics of anime; in particular, some of its production processes were outsourced to Japan. The advent of Japanese anime stylizations appearing in Western animation questioned the established meaning of "anime".

Glen Murakami was also a strong influence in inspiring American cartoons with Japanese elements. He animated alongside Bruce Timm on Batman: The Animated Series and its sequel, Batman: Beyond. Keeping the sharp-edged angular style of Timm and mixing in his own personal influences, the show was given cyberpunk and sci-fi elements with a Japanese twist. American television producer Sam Register - who created anime inspired works such as Ben 10: Alien Force and Hi Hi Puffy AmiYumi - also worked alongside Murakami to create the Teen Titans television show in 2003, giving rise to a unique style referred to as "murakanime". In 2004, Murakami also produced The Batman, which showed much stronger anime influence than even its predecessor Batman Beyond.

Super Robot Monkey Team Hyperforce Go! is the first Jetix original show to be produced by Japanese artists and use an anime concept for the characters, including a transformation sequence for the series' main protagonist, Chiro. Series creator Ciro Nieli, who had also previously served as a director on Teen Titans, would later become showrunner of Teenage Mutant Ninja Turtles (2012), which also featured anime-inspired moments, some of the most notable examples being seen in the characters' reaction shots. In addition, a parody of the anime series Voltron: Defender of the Universe was featured within the series throughout the second season, titled Super Robo Mecha Force Five!

Avatar: The Last Airbender and its sequel series The Legend of Korra are other examples of Western series influenced by Japanese anime so heavily that they started discussions among fans and viewers about what an anime is and whether a non-Japanese animation should be called an anime. Avatar creators Bryan Konietzko and Michael Dante DiMartino confirmed an anime influence in a magazine interview; that of "Hayao Miyazaki, especially Spirited Away and Princess Mononoke" as well as My Neighbor Totoro. Other studios from which inspiration was drawn include Studio 4°C, Production I.G, Polygon Pictures and Studio Ghibli.

The same strong resemblance can be seen in Voltron: Legendary Defender, a reboot of the Voltron franchise, this time produced completely by American artists. Lauren Montgomery and Joaquim Dos Santos, both known for their work on the Avatar: The Last Airbender and its sequel The Legend of Korra, served as showrunners while fellow crew member Tim Hedrick served as head writer. Other heavily anime-inspired American-made shows are the Netflix series Castlevania, created by Warren Ellis, and Blood of Zeus, created by Charley and Vlas Parlapanides. These anime-influenced series have become defined as "anime" by some sources, in an attempt to classify all Japanese-anime styled works of non-Japanese origin.

The American sitcom The Boondocks has many anime-style features, and uses Japanese style fighting. It is shown in many scenes, as Japanese sword styles have been used.

The web series RWBY, produced by Texas-based company Rooster Teeth, is produced using an anime-influenced art style and has been referred to as an American anime by multiple sources. For example, when the series was licensed for release in Japan, AdWeek reported on the situation using the headline "American-made anime from Rooster Teeth gets licensed in Japan". The CEO of Rooster Teeth, Matt Hullum, commented on the licensing agreement, saying "This is the first time any American-made anime has been marketed to Japan. It definitely usually works the other way around, and we're really pleased about that." In 2013, Monty Oum, the creator of RWBY, said “Some believe just like Scotch needs to be made in Scotland, an American company can’t make anime. I think that’s a narrow way of seeing it. Anime is an art form, and to say only one country can make this art is wrong."

In 2015, Netflix announced that it intended to produce anime. In doing so, the company is offering a more accessible channel for distribution to Western markets.

Defining anime as style has been contentious amongst fans, with John Oppliger stating, "The insistence on referring to original American art as "anime" or "manga" robs the work of its cultural identity." 
On the other hand, series like Avatar: The Last Airbender, its sequel and Voltron: Legendary Defender have opened up more debates on whether these works should be called "anime", and whether the culturally abstract approach to the word's meaning may open up the possibility of anime produced in countries other than Japan. While some Westerners strictly view anime as a Japanese animation product, some scholars suggest defining anime as specifically or quintessentially Japanese may be related to a new form of orientalism with some fans and critics arguing that the term should be defined as a "style" rather than as a national product, which leaves open the possibility of anime being produced in other countries.

Stitch! is the anime spin-off of Disney's Lilo & Stitch franchise and the successor to Lilo & Stitch: The Series. It debuted in Japan in October 2008. The show features a Japanese girl named Yuna in place of Lilo, and is set on a fictional island in the Ryukyus off the shore of Okinawa instead of Hawaii.

ND Stevenson and the crew of She-Ra and the Princesses of Power were strongly influenced by anime, especially those with magical girls.

Film
The production on The Animatrix began when the Wachowskis visited some of the creators of the anime films that had been strong influences on their work, and decided to collaborate with them.

Japanese anime has influenced Disney, Pixar and DreamWorks productions. Glen Keane, the animator for successful Disney films such as The Little Mermaid (1989), Beauty and the Beast (1991), Aladdin (1992), and Tangled, has credited Hayao Miyazaki as a "huge influence" on Disney's animated films ever since The Rescuers Down Under (1990). Gary Trousdale and Kirk Wise, the directors of Disney films such as Beauty and the Beast, Hunchback of Notre Dame (1996), and Atlantis: The Lost Empire (2001), are fans of anime and have cited Miyazaki's works as a major influence on their own work. Miyazaki's influence on Disney dates back to The Great Mouse Detective (1986), which was influenced by Miyazaki's Lupin III film Castle of Cagliostro (1979) and which in turn paved the way for the Disney Renaissance.

Controversially, Disney's The Lion King (1994) was accused of plagiarizing Osamu Tezuka's 1960s anime series Kimba the White Lion, due to both works sharing numerous similarities, leading to a protest upon release in Japan. However, Disney denied the accusation of plagiarism. The controversy surrounding Kimba and The Lion King was parodied in a 1995 episode of The Simpsons. A similar controversy surrounded another Disney film, Atlantis: The Lost Empire, which was alleged to have plagiarized the Studio Gainax anime series Nadia: The Secret of Blue Water (1990). Atlantis directors Gary Trousdale and Kirk Wise denied the allegation, but nevertheless acknowledged Miyazaki's films as a major influence on their work.

Miyazaki's work deeply influenced Pixar co-founder John Lasseter, who described how Miyazaki's influence upon his life and work began when he first saw Castle of Cagliostro. Pete Docter, director of the popular Pixar films Monsters, Inc. (2001) and Up (2009) as well as a co-creator of other Pixar works, has also described anime, specifically Miyazaki, as an influence on his work. Jennifer Lee and Chris Buck cited the influence of Miyazaki's anime productions on Frozen (2013), stating that they were inspired by their sense of "epic adventure and that big scope and scale and then the intimacy of funny quirky characters." Chris Sanders and Dean DeBlois described Miyazaki's flight and pacifist themes as an influence for creating How to Train Your Dragon (2010). Joel Crawford, the director of Puss in Boots: The Last Wish (2022), cited Akira (1988) as an influence on the design of the characters and action within the film. Additionally, the film utilized 2D animation to "highlight the personal touch of hand-drawn animation that is found in traditional anime", as noted by Variety'''s Jazz Tangsay.

Brazil
Since the 2000s there have already been countless independent projects for animated series inspired by anime. One of the first attempts was an animated adaptation of the popular manga-styled comic Holy Avenger after its completion in 2003,  however due to financial and production problems the series was never developed. Over the years several other attempts for independent projects for animation inspired by Brazil were created, the most notable being Dogmons!, XDragoon and Magma.

In 2021 an independent platform for anime-inspired animations titled Anistage was created.

Among the anime-inspired Brazilian animated series that premiered on TV are Os Under-Undergrounds that debuted in May 2016, Nickelodeon and Turma da Mônica Jovem, based on the manga-styled comic created by Mauricio de Sousa, that debuted in November 7, 2019.

Despite being a series entirely made in Japan, No Game No Life is often credited by many Brazilians as an authentic Brazilian anime, due to the Brazilian origin of its creator Yuu Kamiya.

Chile

Animated series such as Golpea Duro Hara, a show was an inspiration of the Japanese series such as Dragon Ball and One-Punch Man, released in 2018. It gives the second season in 2020 on Cartoon Network.

In 2020, the Chilean animated film, Nahuel and the Magic Book, inspired by the works of Hayao Miyazaki's projects such as Future Boy Conan and the entire Studio Ghibli with the mixtures of other Western animation such as Steven Universe and Gravity Falls, was created and became the first Latin American won the Tokyo Anime Award for Award of Excellence a year later.

Other countries in the Americas
In 2007, the Canadian anime-style animated short Flutter became the first work from a non-Asian nation to win the Open Entries Grand Prize at the Tokyo Anime Awards.

Europe
France

The French-American international co-production W.I.T.C.H., a magical girl series, has been noted as having an anime-influenced visual style. First season director Marc Gordon-Bates cited anime such as Neon Genesis Evangelion as design inspiration. The animated series is based on Italian comics of the same name themselves drawn in line with manga conventions, as opposed to the more rounded style traditionally used by publisher and co-producer Disney. Co-executive producer Olivier Dumont noted that the high-quality animation was intended to be true to the detailed artwork of the comics series.

The producers of the French anime Code Lyoko, one of the most successful works of European anime, explicitly stated in their introductory document that they were: "Influenced by the poetry and the visual impact of Japanese animation, the series proposes a graphic universe that's particularly original and strong."

The animation and style in Miraculous: Tales of Ladybug & Cat Noir is practically influenced by various Magical girl anime. Toei Animation does some of the modeling for the series, and was originally going to be in an anime-esque art-style. Thomas Astruc, the creator of the show, stated that the production team switched to CGI instead because Ladybug's spots were hard to animate around that time.

Another example of anime-influenced animation can be seen in Wakfu: The Animated Series, a flash animation series based on a video game of the same title.

Spain
In 2018, Movistar+ released Virtual Hero, a Spanish animated series created by YouTube personality El Rubius. It was dubbed as the "first anime in Spanish history". The Netflix original "The Idhun Chronicles", based on The Idhún's Memories book saga written by Laura Gallego, premiered in 2021, also featuring an anime-style animation.

Other European countries

Some French-Canadian series have also been influenced by anime, such as Totally Spies!, Martin Mystery, and Team Galaxy.

The visual style of the American-Italian animated series Winx Club is a mixture of European and Japanese elements, and also very similar to magical girl subgenre.

Asia
Middle East
The Emirati-Filipino produced TV series called Torkaizer is dubbed as the "Middle East's First Anime Show", inspired from Japanese mecha media franchise Gundam and is currently in production, which is currently looking for funding.

Southeast Asia
In June 2021, the Singaporean anime-influenced TV series, Trese was released on Netflix. It is an adaptation of the Filipino komik series of the same name produced by South East Asian BASE Entertainment.

South Asia
Pakistan
A Pakistani hand drawn romantic anime film called The Glassworker is currently in production. It is directed by Usman Riaz. The trailer of the film was released in October 2016. The film will release in 2023 as described by the animation studio's website. It is also Pakistan's and South Asia's first crowd funded movie as it had raised $116,000 on Kickstarter. The reason for this high raise was due to Usman Riaz being a famous musician, speaker. The movie is hand drawn so the scenes of the movie gives it a Studio Ghibli vibe.

India
In India, Karmachakra was produced as one of the first Indian anime influenced animations under Studio Durga. It is a low budget 2D film, despite being anime influenced the pilot of the movie says otherwise, due to its low budget the developers made use of classic 2D style animation which makes it different from anime.

Co-productions with Japan

Occasionally, animated series are developed as outright international co-productions between Japan and one or more other countries, as opposed to having stylistic influence. In the 1980s, there were Japanese-European productions such as Ulysses 31, The Mysterious Cities of Gold, Dogtanian and the Three Muskehounds, Sherlock Hound and The Jungle Book. More recent examples of Canadian and French co-productions include Cybersix (1999) as well as Oban Star-Racers and Spider Riders, both from 2006.Ōban Star-Racers is known as one of the European animations that strongly resemble anime. While the majority of the creative directors and writers were French, the production team moved to Tokyo to collaborate with a Japanese production team.

Animation such as Oban Star-Racers and Code Lyoko, like Avatar: The Last Airbender, are examples over which some critics and fans debate about the term anime and whether it is defined as a "style" rather than as a national product, which leaves open the possibility of anime being produced in other countries.

A Japanese-Filipino produced anime television series Barangay 143 is currently airing on GMA Network.

In April 2020, a studio named Manga Production from Saudi Arabia announced the release of The Journey and Future's Folktales, co-produced with Toei.

Japanese-American Yasuke, an anime adaptation of the historical figure of the same name made by LeSean Thomas co-produced with MAPPA released on April 2021.

Polish-Japanese Cyberpunk: Edgerunners'', an anime adaptation of the video game of the same name made by CD Projekt co-produced with Studio Trigger released on September 2022.

See also

 Dubbing
 Original English-language manga
 La nouvelle manga
 Limited animation
 Orientalism

References

Sources
 

 
 
Anime and manga terminology
Japan in non-Japanese culture